The Wallumbilla Formation is an Aptian geologic formation found in Australia. Plesiosaur and theropod remains are among the fossils that have been recovered from its strata.

Description 
The formation is present in the Northern Territory, Queensland, South Australia, and New South Wales. It is a sedimentary unit, principally made up of mudstone and siltstone, with calcareous concretions. Its maximum thickness is 600 metres. Its age is somewhere from Aptian to Albian, that is between 125 and 101 Mya. The formation is part of the Wilgunya Subgroup, which in turn is part of the Rolling Downs Group of the Eromanga and Surat Basins. The named beds are the Coreena, Doncaster, Jones Valley, Ranmoor, and Trimble Members.

Fossil content

See also 
 Plesiosaur stratigraphic distribution
 South Polar region of the Cretaceous

References

Further reading 
 E. F. Riek. 1954. A second specimen of the dragon-fly Aeschnidiopsis flindersiensis (Woodward) from the Queensland Cretaceous. The Proceedings of the Linnean Society of New South Wales 79:61-62

Geologic formations of Australia
Cretaceous System of Australia
Early Cretaceous Australia
Aptian Stage
Mudstone formations
Siltstone formations
Fossiliferous stratigraphic units of Oceania
Paleontology in Australia
Geology of New South Wales
Geology of the Northern Territory
Geology of Queensland
Geology of South Australia